The Traverse City Beach Bums were a professional baseball team based in the Traverse City, Michigan suburb of Blair Township from 2006-2018. The Beach Bums played in the independent Frontier League.

The Beach Bums were established in 2006 when the Richmond Roosters franchise was purchased and moved from Richmond, Indiana.  The Roosters had begun playing in the third season of the Frontier League and existed from 1995-2005.  The Beach Bums played their home games at Wuerfel Park in Traverse City, named for then owners John and Leslye Wuerfel.  The Roosters played at Don McBride Stadium in Richmond.

In 2018, the franchise was sold to the owners of the Midwest League West Michigan Whitecaps who folded the Frontier League affiliation and launched a new team in the Northwoods League, the Traverse City Pit Spitters.

The team is represented in the Frontier League Hall of Fame by Beach Bums pitcher Scott Dunn and Traverse City 1B Chase Burch.

Richmond Roosters

The Richmond Roosters joined the Frontier League in 1995, and played at the historic McBride Stadium, which opened in 1936.

The Roosters were led in the 1995 season by Morgan Burkhart, who would become the second Frontier League player to make a Major League Baseball team when he joined the Boston Red Sox in 2000.  Brian Tollberg of the Chillicothe Paints was the first league alumnus to make the majors, beating Burkhart by a week in the 2000 season. Burkhart won three league Frontier League MVP awards (1995-1997) and the league MVP award is now named after him.

Richmond won back-to-back Frontier League championships in 2001 and 2002, led by player-manager Fran Riordan.  In 2001, the Roosters upset the league-best Paints 2-0 in the best-of-three championship series to capture their first Frontier League title. The team repeated as Frontier League champions in 2002, again upsetting the league-best Washington Wild Things 3-1 in a best of five series for the title.

Growth in the Frontier League challenged the small Richmond franchise and the ownership group elected to sell the franchise at the conclusion of the 2005 season. The last home game for the Roosters was a 9-3 loss to the Evansville Otters on September 2, 2005, and the team finished the season on the road with the last Richmond game being a 9-8 road loss to the Florence Freedom on September 5, 2005.

Traverse City Beach Bums

The Beach Bums were Traverse City's first professional baseball team since 1914. Predecessors included the semi-professional Traverse City Hustlers of the 1890s, and the Class D minor league Traverse City Resorters (1910-1914). Following the 2004 season, the Frontier League granted a franchise for Traverse City, however the league was not sure whether to consider the team for expansion or relocation. Then, in 2005, the Richmond Roosters were purchased and the franchise moved to Traverse City.

The move and a slow start in Traverse City led to a 7-year franchise absence from post-season play. The Beach Bums advanced to the 2010 Frontier League championship, dropping the series 3-1 to the River City Rascals. Enrique Lechuga (10-3, 2.88 ERA), closer Scott Mueller (4-4, 2.04 ERA, 14 saves), and Chase Burch (.299 BA, 19 HR, 88 RBI) paced Traverse City. The team then established consistency with players such 2012 Frontier League MVP Jose Vargas (.290 BA, 29 HR, 100 RBI) but lost in the division series in 2012 and 2013. The Beach Bums added to the franchise championship history in 2015, advancing from a play-in game to take the title in a best of five series sweep, defeating the River City Rascals 3-0. The 2015 Bums were led by pitchers Ian MacDougall (10-6, 2.51 ERA), Kramer Champlin (10-6, 2.05 ERA) and Andrew Brockett (3-0, 1.54 ERA, 21 saves), along with 3B Jose Vargas (.314 BA, 10 HR, 51 RBI) and OF Brandon Jacobs (.320 BA, 17 HR, 54 RBI).

Declining attendance led to the team being sold at the conclusion of the 2018 season to owners of the West Michigan Whitecaps. The franchise left the Frontier League to join the summer collegiate baseball Northwoods League, and the team's name was changed to the Traverse City Pit Spitters. The stadium was renamed to Turtle Creek Stadium after the sale. The franchise's final Frontier League professional game was a 9-2 loss to the Windy City ThunderBolts, played at Wuerfel Park on August 31, 2018, before 3,142 spectators.

Season-by-season records

References

External links 
 Traverse City Beach Bums
 Frontier League
 Beach Bums page at OurSports Central

Sports in Traverse City, Michigan
Former Frontier League teams
Defunct baseball teams in Michigan
Defunct independent baseball league teams
Baseball teams established in 1995
Defunct Frontier League teams
Baseball teams disestablished in 2018